Flora is an unincorporated community in Pipe Creek Township, Miami County, in the U.S. state of Indiana.

History
Flora was founded in 1955 by Norman Flora, and named for him.

References

Unincorporated communities in Miami County, Indiana
Unincorporated communities in Indiana